Bovelles is a commune in the Somme department in Hauts-de-France in northern France.

Geography

Population

History
 1750 : Construction of the château, the residence of Général de Gribeauval, inventor of a cannon.
 Temporarily chef-lieu of the canton during the French Revolution.

 1870 : Consecration of the new church.
 1940 : Evacuated during the German occupation
 January 2004 : Bovelles joined the Communauté d'agglomération Amiens Métropole.

See also
Communes of the Somme department

References

External links

 Official website 
 Marc Roussel personal site 
 Parish website (22 communes), by l'Abbé Jean-Pierre Dalibot 

Communes of Somme (department)